José Fidel Sipi Bita (born 7 January 2001) is an Equatorial Guinean professional footballer who plays as a midfielder for Moldovan Super Liga club FC Dinamo-Auto Tiraspol and the Equatorial Guinea national team.

International career
Sipi made his international debut for Equatorial Guinea on 28 July 2019.

References

External links

2001 births
Living people
Bubi people
Equatoguinean footballers
Association football midfielders
Cano Sport Academy players
FC Dinamo-Auto Tiraspol players
Moldovan Super Liga players
Equatorial Guinea international footballers
Equatoguinean expatriate footballers
Equatoguinean expatriates in Moldova
Expatriate footballers in Moldova